Happy Valley may refer to:

Places

American Samoa
 Happy Valley, American Samoa, a residential area in Pago Pago

Australia
 Happy Valley, New South Wales
 Happy Valley, Queensland (K'gari)
 Happy Valley, Queensland (Mount Isa)
 Happy Valley, South Australia
 Happy Valley, Victoria (Golden Plains Shire)
 Happy Valley, Victoria
 Happy Valley, Western Australia, in the Millbrook State Forest
 City of Happy Valley, a local government area in South Australia from 1935 to 1997
 City of Happy Valley, Noarlunga and Willunga, a former name of City of Onkaparinga, South Australia

Canada
 Happy Valley, British Columbia
 Happy Valley, Greater Sudbury, Ontario, a ghost town
 Happy Valley Forest, in King, Ontario
 Happy Valley, King, Ontario, a community within the forest
 Happy Valley-Goose Bay, Newfoundland and Labrador
 Rural Municipality of Happy Valley No. 10, Saskatchewan

China
Hong Kong is listed separately.
 Happy Valley (amusement parks), a chain of theme parks, including a list of the eight parks
 Western Surprise Happy Valley, in Shifang, Sichuan Province, not related to  Happy Valley (amusement parks)
 Happy Valley (Guangzhou), a shopping mall in Guangzhou

Germany
 Happy Valley, a nickname for Hoppstädten-Weiersbach Airfield in Germany
 Happy Valley, an ironic nickname used by RAF bomber crews during World War II for the Ruhr; see Battle of the Ruhr

Hong Kong
 Happy Valley, Hong Kong

India
 Happy Valley, Shillong, Meghalaya
 Happy Valley, Mussoorie, Uttarakhand

Kenya
 Happy Valley, Kenya, a region of the Wanjohi Valley in colonial British Kenya

New Zealand
 Happy Valley, Wellington
 Happy Valley, West Coast; see Save Happy Valley Coalition
 Happy Valley, a beginner's area at Whakapapa skifield

United Kingdom
 Happy Valley (garden), in Orkney, Scotland
 Happy Valley Park, Coulsdon, London
 A landmark in Stockport
 A nickname for Bollington, Cheshire
 An area on the side of the Great Orme in Llandudno, North Wales
 The name "Happy Valley" is what local police in the Calder Valley in Yorkshire, England, call the area because of its drug problem.

United States
 Happy Valley, Alaska
 Happy Valley, Calaveras County, California
 Happy Valley, Plumas County, California
 Happy Valley, Shasta County, California
 Happy Valley, Kentucky
 Happy Valley, New Mexico
 Happy Valley, Oregon
 Happy Valley (Pennsylvania), a region of Centre County
 A nickname for State College, Pennsylvania
 Happy Valley, Tennessee (disambiguation)
 A nickname for Utah County, Utah
 Happy Valley Wildlife Management Area, in Oswego County, New York; part of the New York State Wildlife Management Areas

Vietnam
 Happy Valley, Vietnam

Arts, entertainment, and media
 Happy Valley, a setting in the 1947 film segment Mickey and the Beanstalk
 Happy Valley (film), a 2014 documentary film about the Penn State child sex abuse scandal
 Happy Valley (novel), a 1939 novel by Patrick White
 Happy Valley (TV series), a BBC One drama series broadcast in 2014, 2016 and 2023
 The Happy Valley, a 1987 TV film set in 1930s Kenya 
 "Happy Valley", a composition by Vanessa-Mae from her album China Girl: The Classical Album 2 (1997)
 The setting of The History of Rasselas, Prince of Abissinia by Samuel Johnson

Education
 Happy Valley Elementary School District, Santa Cruz County, California, United States
 Happy Valley Union Elementary School District, Santa Cruz County, California, United States

Sports
 Happy Valley AA, an association football team based in Hong Kong
 Happy Valley Football Club, South Australia
 Happy Valley Racecourse, a racecourse for horse racing in Hong Kong

Transport
 Happy Valley station (disambiguation)

Other uses
 Happy Valley (constituency), a constituency in the Wan Chai District of Hong Kong
 Happy Valley Football Club, an Australian rules football club
 Happy Valley Reservoir, a water reservoir in Adelaide, Australia
 Happy Valley set, a notorious group of British expatriates in Kenya from the 1920s-1940s
 Happy Valley Tea Estate, a tea garden in Darjeeling district, West Bengal, India
 Happy Valley, a chain of regional amusement parks in China owned by Overseas Chinese Town Enterprises

See also
 Happy Valley-Goose Bay, a town in Newfoundland and Labrador, Canada

References